Gilberto Viadana (born 9 February 1973) is an Italian former figure skater. He reached the free skate at four European Championships, three World Championships, and two Winter Olympics (1992, 1998).

Life and career 
Gilberto Viadana was born on 9 February 1973 in Milan, Italy. He placed 11th at the 1990 Junior Worlds in Colorado Springs, Colorado; 14th at the 1991 Junior Worlds in Budapest; and fifth at the 1992 Junior Worlds in Hull, Quebec.

At the 1992 Olympics in Albertville, Viadana placed 19th in the short program before withdrawing from the competition. He finished 23rd at the 1998 Olympics in Nagano, Japan. He was the first Italian skater to complete a triple Axel jump in competition.

After ending his competitive career, Viadana became a coach in Milano. His students competed at the national championships, Europeans, Worlds, and 2002 Olympics. He moved to the United States in 2004 and joined the Lake Placid Skating Club in Lake Placid, New York. He became the director of the Olympic Center Skating School in 2008. He is a former Figure Skating Director for the Mid Hudson Civic Center where he manages the McCann arena and the Ice Time Sports Complex. He is an ISU technical specialist since 2004.

Results
GP: Champions Series (Grand Prix)

References

Italian male single skaters
1973 births
Living people
Olympic figure skaters of Italy
Figure skaters at the 1992 Winter Olympics
Figure skaters at the 1998 Winter Olympics